Morrelganj Union is a Union Parishad under Morrelganj Upazila of Bagerhat District in the division of Khulna, Bangladesh. It has an area of 41.36 km2 (15.97 sq mi) and a population of 12,530.

Villages
 Gabtala
 Kathaltala
 Vaijor
 Badurtala
 Bisharighata
 Purbo Saralia
 Paschim Saralia
 Uttar Saralia

References

Unions of Morrelganj Upazila
Unions of Bagerhat District
Unions of Khulna Division